Om Parkash Barwa was a member of the Haryana Legislative Assembly from the INLD representing the Loharu Vidhan sabha Constituency in Haryana. He served during 2014-2019 term.

References 

Members of the Haryana Legislative Assembly